Ahmed Hamed Mahmoud "Al-Tesh" (born on 7 March 1993) is a Sudanese professional football player who plays for the Sudanese national team.

On 9 October 2021, he scored his first goal for Sudan against Guinea during the 2022 FIFA World Cup qualification match in a 2–2 draw.

References

External links
 
 

1993 births
Living people
Sudanese footballers
Association football midfielders
Sudan international footballers